Joseph Dennis Williams (born March 5, 1965) is a former American football linebacker who played one season with the Pittsburgh Steelers of the National Football League. He played college football at Grambling State University and attended McKinley Senior High School in Baton Rouge, Louisiana. He was also a member of the New England Steamrollers and Denver Dynamite and Arena Football League.

References

Married to Tangi Milton Williams
sons
Joseph D. Williams Jr.
Joshua Williams
Jeremy Williams
Joel Williams
daughters
Avril, Megan, Italy and Ariel

External links
Just Sports Stats

Living people
1965 births
Players of American football from Baton Rouge, Louisiana
American football linebackers
African-American players of American football
Grambling State Tigers football players
Pittsburgh Steelers players
National Football League replacement players
21st-century African-American people
20th-century African-American sportspeople